The QBE Shootout is a team golf event that takes place on the PGA Tour as an unofficial money event. It was originally played during the off-season, but now it is played during the wrap-around season's December break.

The event began in 1989, as the RMCC Invitational. It is hosted by golfer Greg Norman. The tournament was soon renamed the Shark Shootout after Norman's nickname, and has had several names since (see Winners below ). The first eleven editions of the tournament were played at Sherwood Country Club in Thousand Oaks, California (1989–99). It was then played for one year at Doral Resort & Spa, on the Norman designed Great White Course, before moving to Tiburón Golf Club in Naples, Florida in 2001, where it is played over the Norman designed Gold Course.

Format
The Shootout is a 3-day, 54-hole stroke play event in which teams of two compete. The format since 2014 has been:
 First round: scramble, also known as ambrose or best-shot. Both players tee off on each hole; having decided which result is better, both play their next stroke from within a club-length of that position, but no closer to the hole. This procedure is repeated until the hole is finished.
 Second round: greensomes, also known as modified alternate shot or Scotch foursomes.  Both players tee off on each hole and the ball finishing in the better position is chosen; alternate strokes are then played to complete the hole, with the player who did not play the chosen ball from the tee taking the next stroke.
 Final round: better ball, also known as best ball.  Each golfer plays their own ball throughout, with the lower score being counted on each hole.

Broadcasting history
The event was originally broadcast in the United States by the USA Network and CBS, with USA broadcasting the first round on a tape-delayed basis, and CBS handling the second round live – it was then a two-round tournament. Not all the country saw the final round live, as CBS's commitment to the NFL only allowed part of the country to see the round as it took place, with the rest of the U.S. seeing the event beginning at 4 p.m. Eastern Time. 

In 2007, the event was moved to December, and was broadcast live by both Golf Channel and NBC. It remained on these networks through 2013.  In 2014, weekend coverage moved to Fox, where Norman had become an analyst. The telecast served as a prelude to Fox's coverage of the 2015 U.S. Open.  In 2017, weekend coverage returned to NBC.

Winners

References

External links

Coverage on the PGA Tour's official site
Tiburón Golf Club

PGA Tour unofficial money events
Golf in California
Golf in Florida
Recurring sporting events established in 1989
1989 establishments in California